Anticla antica is a moth in the family Bombycidae. It was described by Francis Walker in 1855. It is found in Venezuela.

References

Bombycidae
Moths described in 1855